Neißeaue is a municipality in the district Görlitz, Saxony, Germany. It was formed in 1995, uniting Deschka, Emmerichswalde, Groß Krauscha (seat of administration), Kaltwasser, Klein Krauscha, Neu Krauscha, Zentendorf and Zodel. The easternmost point in Germany lies within its municipal limits, including Zentendorf, the easternmost settlement in Germany.

From German unification in 1871, until World War II, the title was held by the village of Schirwindt, in East Prussia.

References 

Populated places in Görlitz (district)